The Badner Bahn or Wiener Lokalbahn is a tram-train service in the metropolitan area of Vienna. In 2013, 35,000 passengers per day used the service.

Route 

Starting from the Vienna State Opera, the service uses the tracks of Vienna's tram network as far as the Schedifkaplatz tram stop in the Meidling district, including parts of a pre-metro tram tunnel. These tracks are owned and maintained by Wiener Lokalbahnen.

Since 14 December 2014, there is a new train station at the state clinical center in Baden. Despite its addition to the route, the length of a journey could be kept at 62 minutes.

Rolling stock 

Most trainsets currently in use are class 100 high-floor units built between 1979 and 1993 by Simmering-Graz-Pauker. 26 of these were ordered, and 2 discharged in 2010 because of problems obtaining replacement parts. Although it would be technically possible to use trains consisting of up to three class 100 units, there are currently only single-unit and double-unit trains. Additionally, there are 14 low-floor class 400 units built between 2000 and 2010 by Bombardier in operation (often as double-unit trains with a class 100 unit).

References

External links 
 
 Website of Wiener Lokalbahnen

Rail transport in Austria
Railway lines opened in 1873
Standard gauge railways in Austria